Peter Baumann (born 1953) is a German musician with Tangerine Dream.

Peter Baumann may also refer to:
Peter Baumann (computer scientist) (born 1960), German computer scientist and professor
Peter Baumann (psychiatrist) (1935–2011), Swiss physician known for participating in assisted suicides